Thomas Amory may refer to:

 Thomas Amory (author) (1691–1788), Irish writer
 Thomas Amory (tutor) (1701–1774), English dissenting tutor, minister, and poet
 Thomas Coffin Amory (1812–1889), American lawyer and  biographer
 Thomas J.C. Amory (1828–1864), American Civil War officer